Richard Ingleby Jefferson (born 15 August 1941 in Frimley Green, Surrey) was a professional cricketer who played for Surrey County Cricket Club. 

The son of Brigadier Julian Jefferson, Jefferson was educated at Ludgrove School, Winchester College and Corpus Christi College, Cambridge. He won a blue but left after a year. He went on to play a couple of seasons for Surrey before illness in 1965 curtailed his first-class career. He subsequently played for Norfolk, before taking a Certificate in Education and teaching in a private school.  

A right-arm medium-fast bowler and right-handed bat, he was mentioned in a 1981 article by John Arlott on the best English cricketers never to have played for England. Arlott wrote that "he may well have been the greatest loss to English cricket in the post-war period".

He is the father of the cricketer Will Jefferson.

External links

References 

1941 births
Living people
Alumni of Corpus Christi College, Cambridge
Cambridge University cricketers
Cricketers from Frimley
English cricketers
Gentlemen cricketers
International Cavaliers cricketers
Marylebone Cricket Club cricketers
Minor Counties cricketers
Norfolk cricketers
People educated at Winchester College
Surrey cricketers
People educated at Ludgrove School